Lama ("chief") is a title for a teacher of the Dharma in Tibetan Buddhism. The name is similar to the Sanskrit term guru, meaning "heavy one", endowed with qualities the student will eventually embody. The Tibetan word "lama" means "highest principle", and less literally "highest mother" or "highest parent" to show close relationship between teacher and student.

Historically, the term was used for venerated spiritual masters or heads of monasteries. Today the title can be used as an honorific title conferred on a monk, nun or a lay person (especially in the Nyingma, Kagyu and Sakya schools) advanced tantric practitioner to designate a level of spiritual attainment and authority to teach, or may be part of a title such as Dalai Lama or Panchen Lama applied to a lineage of reincarnate lamas (Tulkus).

Perhaps due to misunderstandings by early western scholars attempting to understand Tibetan Buddhism, the term lama has historically been erroneously applied to Tibetan monks in general. Similarly, Tibetan Buddhism was referred to as "Lamaism" by early western scholars and travelers who perhaps did not understand that what they were witnessing was a form of Buddhism; they may also have been unaware of the distinction between Tibetan Buddhism and Bön. The term Lamaism is now considered by some to be derogatory.

In the Vajrayana path of Tibetan Buddhism, the lama is often the tantric spiritual guide, the guru to the aspiring Buddhist yogi or yogini. As such, the lama will then appear as one of the Three Roots (a variant of the Three Jewels), alongside the yidam and protector (who may be a dakini, dharmapala or other Buddhist deity figure). The mind of the lama is considered Buddha – one's highest potential, the lama's speech is dharma, and the lama's body is one's guide and companion on the way to enlightenment, meaning the lama is the perfect embodiment of the sangha. Another expression of lama can be expressed through the 3 Kayas.

See also 
 Bhikkhu
 Khenpo
 Rinpoche
 Rōshi
 Sensei
 Shifu

References

 
Asceticism
Tibetan Buddhist titles
Lama